La Gran Colombia University is a private university located in Bogotá, D.C., Colombia. It was founded on May 24, 1951, by Julio César García Valencia, recognized Colombian historian of the Twentieth century.

Faculties
 Accountancy
 Architecture
 Business administration
 Civil engineering
 Systems engineering
 Agroindustry engineering
 Economics
 Education sciences
 Law

Institutes
 Ethics Center
 Innovation Center
 Julio César García Lyceum
 Languages Center

See also
 Great Colombia

External links
 La Gran Colombia University Official Web Site
 La Gran Colombia University Official Web Site ARMENIA

La Gran Colombia University
Educational institutions established in 1951
La Gran Colombia University
1951 establishments in Colombia